The 1999 FIA GT Donington 500 km was the seventh round the 1999 FIA GT Championship season.  It took place at Donington Park, United Kingdom, on 5 September 1999.

Official results
Cars failing to complete 70% of winner's distance are marked as Not Classified (NC).

Statistics
 Pole position – #25 Lister Storm Racing – 1:31.716
 Fastest lap – #1 Chrysler Viper Team Oreca – 1:33.338
 Average speed – 148.010 km/h

References

 
 
 

D
FIA GT Donington